Patrick Wellar (born December 4, 1983) is a Canadian former professional ice hockey player, who is currently the assistant coach for the Hershey Bears in the American Hockey League. He was selected by the Washington Capitals in the 3rd round (77th overall) of the 2002 NHL Entry Draft.

At the conclusion of the 2012–13 season on May 10, 2013, Wellar was re-signed by the Hershey Bears on a one-year contract, marking his sixth year with the club.  Following the 2013–14 season, Wellar did not return to the Bears.  On September 8, 2014, the Utah Grizzlies announced that Wellar would be joining the team as a player and an assistant coach. In the 2014–15 season, Wellar appeared in 60 games from the blueline contributing with 12 points.

On August 20, 2015, Wellar was announced to have signed a one-year deal in a return to the Alaska Aces, with whom he helped win the Kelly Cup in 2006. At the conclusion of the season with the Aces, Wellar opted to retire from professional hockey after 12 years. He was hired as an assistant coach to the Cincinnati Cyclones of the ECHL on August 4, 2016.

Career statistics

References

External links

1983 births
Alaska Aces (ECHL) players
Calgary Hitmen players
Columbia Inferno players
Hershey Bears players
Living people
Peoria Rivermen (AHL) players
Peoria Rivermen (ECHL) players
Portland Winterhawks players
Reading Royals players
South Carolina Stingrays players
Toronto Marlies players
Utah Grizzlies (ECHL) players
Washington Capitals draft picks
Worcester IceCats players
Canadian ice hockey forwards